"The Fir-Tree" (Danish: Grantræet) is a literary fairy tale by the Danish poet and author Hans Christian Andersen (1805–1875). The tale is about a fir tree so anxious to grow up, so anxious for greater things, that he cannot appreciate living in the moment. The tale was first published 21 December 1844 with "The Snow Queen", in New Fairy Tales. First Volume. Second Collection, in Copenhagen, Denmark, by C.A. Reitzel. One scholar (Andersen biographer Jackie Wullschlager) indicates that "The Fir-Tree" was the first of Andersen's fairy tales to express a deep pessimism.

Plot summary

In the woods stands a little fir-tree. He is preoccupied with growing up and is thoroughly embarrassed when a hare hops over him, an act which emphasizes his diminutiveness. The women call him the baby of the forest and again he is embarrassed and frustrated. A stork tells him of seeing older trees chopped down and used as ship masts, and the little tree envies them. In the fall, nearby trees are felled and the sparrows tell the little fir-tree of seeing them decorated in houses.

One day while still in his youth, the fir-tree is cut down for a Christmas decoration. He is bought, carried into a house, decorated, and, on Christmas Eve, glows with candles, colored apples, toys, and baskets of candy. A gold star tops the tree. The children enter and plunder the tree of its candy and gifts, then listen to a little fat man tell the story of 'Klumpe-Dumpe' "who fell down-stairs, and yet was raised to high honours, and obtained the princess's hand". (Most English translations render 'Klumpe-Dumpe' as "Humpty Dumpty", which sounds similar, although Mette Norgaard points out that the story is different, of the "Blockhead Hans" type.)

The next day, the fir-tree expects the festivities to be renewed, but servants take the tree down and carry him into the attic. The tree is lonely and disappointed, but the mice gather to hear the tree recite the tale of "Klumpe-Dumpe". Rats arrive and, when they belittle the simple tale, the mice leave and do not return. In the spring, the fir-tree – now withered and discolored – is carried into the yard. A boy walks on the tree and takes the star from its topmost branch. The fir-tree is then cut into pieces and burned.

Publication history

"The Fir-Tree" was published with "The Snow Queen" on 21 December 1844 by C.A. Reitzel, in Copenhagen, Denmark, in New Fairy Tales. First Volume. Second Collection (Nye Eventyr. Første Bind. Anden Samling). The tale was republished 18 December 1849 as a part of Fairy Tales 1850 and again on 15 December 1862 as a part of Fairy Tales and Stories 1862.  The tale has since been translated into various languages and printed around the world.

Andersen promoted the tale by reading it aloud at social gatherings. In December 1845, he read "The Fir-Tree" and "The Ugly Duckling" to the Princess of Prussia, and then read "The Fir-Tree" at Count Bismarck-Bohlen's Christmas party.  Folklorist Wilhelm Grimm was present at the party and liked the tale, according to Andersen's diary.

Commentary
Andersen's biographer, Jackie Wullschlager, suggests the tale portrays a certain psychological type (like its author) who cannot be happy in the moment because he expects greater glory just around the corner and then is overwhelmed with regret. The fir-tree, like his creator, is "a fantasist, vain, fearful, restless, afflicted with the trembling sensitivity of the neurotic, manically swinging from hope to misery." By placing the tale in a gentle, nonthreatening domestic setting of silk draperies and comfortable sofas, the tale's fatalistic tone was accepted by the bourgeois adult reader who could identify with the tragic fir-tree's anxious longing and limitless pining.

Andersen had written tales with unhappy endings before ("The Little Mermaid" and "The Steadfast Tin Soldier", for example) but a new note was struck with "The Fir-Tree"—a note of "deeply ingrained pessimism, suggesting not only the mercilessness of fate but the pointlessness of life itself, that only the moment is worthwhile."  For the first time in his fairy tales, Andersen expressed an existential doubt that his religious beliefs could not allay. Such doubt was touched upon again in later tales such as "Auntie Toothache" and "Old Johanna's Tale". Wullschlager believes the tale is an appropriate complement to Andersen's "The Snowman" of 1861.

Adaptations
The tale was adapted to a 28-minute video format in 1979 by Huntingwood Films produced by Kevin Sullivan, directed by Martin Hunter and filmed at Black Creek Pioneer Village, Toronto, Ontario, Canada. Jeff Kahnert provided the voice of the Fir-Tree. This was the first film produced by Kevin Sullivan who went on to write, direct and produce the Anne of Green Gables movies.

It was adapted as the sixteenth episode of The Fairytaler.

In 2011, the story was again adapted as a short, Danish-language film directed by Lars Henrik Ostenfeld and presented in a modern setting. The story follows the tree from cone through seedling, until it is cut down by a boy and his father to be used as a Christmas tree. Unlike Andersen's tale, which ends with the burning of the tree, the film shows a cone from the tree surviving the fire and being thrown into the forest, perhaps to grow into another fir tree.

In 2014, Janani Sreenivasan adapted her script "Pine", originally performed at the University of Iowa's No Shame Theatre in December 2006, into the short film "The Fir Tree", which she co-directed with Lee Jutton. In this version, we hear the tree's first-person account (in Danish) of being chopped down and attending its first Christmas party, which ends badly for all involved.

Charles M. Schulz, author and artist of the world-renowned Peanuts comic strip, incorporated elements of "The Fir Tree" into his first television movie, A Charlie Brown Christmas (December 9, 1965 on CBS).

See also

List of works by Hans Christian Andersen
List of Christmas-themed literature

References

External links

 "The Fir Tree" English translation by Jean Hersholt
 Grantræet Original Danish text
 
 

1844 short stories
Danish fairy tales
Short stories by Hans Christian Andersen
Christmas short stories
Fictional trees